Aghaboy may refer to several places in Ireland:

 Aghaboy, County Antrim
 Aghaboy, County Monaghan 	
 Aghaboy, County Tyrone
 Aghaboy (Kinawley), County Cavan